Gia Rai may refer to:
 The Vietnamese name for the Jarai people
 Giá Rai District, Bạc Liêu Province